The Bureau of Land Management Back Country Byways are roads that have been designated by the Bureau of Land Management as scenic byways. Some are also National Scenic Byways or National Forest Scenic Byways. The program was initiated in 1989, and since then, 54 byways have been designated in the Western United States. Each byway is classified into one of four types based on the vehicles that can traverse it.

Type I—Roads are paved or have an all weather surface and have grades that are negotiable by a normal touring car. These roads are usually narrow, slow speed, secondary roads.
Type II—Roads require high-clearance vehicles such as trucks or 4-wheel drives. These roads are usually not paved, but may have some type of surfacing. Grades, curves, and road surface are such that they can be negotiated with a 2-wheel drive high clearance vehicle without undue difficulty.
Type III— Roads require 4-wheel drive vehicles or other specialized vehicles such as dirt bikes, all-terrain vehicles (ATVs), etc. These roads are usually not surfaced, but are managed to provide for safety considerations and resource protection needs. They have grades, tread surfaces, and other characteristics that will require specialized vehicles to negotiate.
Type IV—Trails that are managed specifically to accommodate dirt bike, mountain bike, snowmobile, or ATV use. These are usually single track trails.


List

See also

References

External links

 
BLM Scenic
Bureau of Land Management areas